Claudio Alejandro Marcelo Arredondo Medina (born 29 November 1962, in Santiago) is a Chilean film, theater and television actor and politician.

Acting career 
He studied at the Fernando González Acting Academy.

He began his career in 1982 on the television series De cara al mañana on Televisión Nacional de Chile. The same year he emigrated to Canal 13 to be part of the successful novels Los títeres and Ángel malo. After a time away by a veto, he returns to Canal 13 to be part of Viviendo así.

In the late 1980s, he founded the "Teatro de la Esquina" which was showing plays for school children. The theater had to close in 2000. 

From 1989 to 2010 he was part of the Dramatic Area of TVN, participating in supporting roles in the telenovelas A la sombra del angel, Aquelarre, Amores de mercado, Los treinta, Alguien te mira and Los Ángeles de Estela, among others. Arredondo is widely known for his multiple collaborations with director María Eugenia Rencoret.

He starred in the hit 2005 series Heredia y Asociados, for which he received the Altazor Award for Best Television Actor in the 2006 issue. 

In 2011, after 22 years, he returns to Channel 13 to be one of the protagonists of Peleles.

In 2015 he emigrated to the Mega Dramatic Area to participate in the television series Papá a la deriva.

He made his film debut in the medium-length film Ángeles by Tatiana Gaviola. He has also been a part of the films  Negocio redondo, Matar a todos y Casa de remolienda.

Political career 
He appeared in the municipal elections of Chile in 2012 where he was elected councilor of the commune of La Florida (Greater Santiago) for the period 2012–2016 as an independent supported by the Christian Democratic Party of Chile. He ran again for councilor in the period 2016–2020, and was re-elected.

Personal life 
He is the son of actress Gabriela Medina and her first husband, although he took the surname of her adoptive father, also actor César Arredondo. 

In 1986 he married the actress and current deputy Carolina Marzán, with whom he is the father of the actress Carolina Arredondo.

In the 1990s he had a relationship with actress Marcela Stangher with whom he is the father of María José.

In 2012 he married the actress Ana Luz Figueroa. They are both parents of Teo.

Filmography

Films 
 Ángeles (1988) – Antonio
 Negocio redondo (2001)
 Matar a todos (2007)
 Casa de remolienda (2007)
 Ema (2019)

Telenovelas

TV Series

Theatre plays

As actor 
 A la cabeza del ganado
 Trilogía Equipo
 Te llamas Rosicler
 Ardiente paciencia
 Idiota
 Nuestras mujeres
 Revueltos
 Entre amigos
 Tres noches de un sábado 
 Pancho Villa
 Confesiones del pene
 Excusas
 Adela, la mal Pagá
 Por la razón o la fuerza
 Todos tenemos problemas sexuales
 El cepillo de dientes
 Háblame de Laura
 Stand up

As director 

 El Soldadito de Plomo
 Acaloradas
 ¿Dónde estará la Jeannette?
 Duros
 Aniversario
 Misterio gozoso

References 

1962 births
Chilean television actors
Chilean film actors
People from Santiago
Actors from Santiago
20th-century Chilean actors
21st-century Chilean actors
Chilean politicians
Living people
Chilean actor-politicians